Modulus modulus, commonly known as the buttonsnail, is a species of small sea snail, a marine gastropod mollusk in the family Modulidae.

Distribution
The distribution of this species includes both the east and west coast of Florida.

Description 
The maximum recorded shell length is 16.5 mm. The overall shape of the shell is button-like, with a gray or brown streaked, ridge-sculptured body whorl and a low spire.

Habitat 
The minimum recorded depth is 0 m. The maximum recorded depth is 105 m.
Found in shell grit and coral sand, among sea grass beds -at 2 to 3 feet depth.

References
 
 Florida's Living Beaches by Blair and Dawn Witherington, 2010, Pineapple Press, Inc.

External links

Modulidae
Gastropods described in 1758
Taxa named by Carl Linnaeus